Kronan may refer to:
 Kronan (ship), a 17th-century Swedish warship sunk in the Baltic Sea
 Krónan, an Icelandic supermarket chain
 Kronan (bicycle), a Swedish bicycle brand
 Kronan, a brand of snus produced by Swedish Match
 Kronan (comics), an alien race in the Marvel Comics
 Kronan, a fantasy hero of Spanish comic artist Jaime Brocal Remohi

See also
 Crown (headgear)
 Kronen, German brewery
 Kronin, village in Poland
Cronan (disambiguation)